Wisdom in Chains is an American hardcore punk band based out of Northeastern Pennsylvania. The band's name is taken from the lyrics of a song by the New York hardcore band Killing Time. "Wisdom", from Killing Time's 1989 debut album, Brightside, opens with, "Wisdom in chains, unlocked too late".

Biography 
Originally, Wisdom in Chains started as an international collaboration between members of Daredevil in the Netherlands and members of Krutch in the United States. Maarten, guitarist of Daredevil (Dutch hardcore band), contacted  Mad Joe Black and Richie Krutch, who  were both in Krutch at the time, about forming a hardcore band with heavy punk and oi! influences. In September 2001 Maarten came to the U.S. for a recording session with  Mad Joe, Richie, and Shawn (drummer for Krutch). The tracks recorded during this session were eventually released in 2003 on GSR as the band's self-titled debut.

After Out To Win/Mushmouth disbanded, Richie and Mad Joe decided to restart Wisdom in Chains and, after receiving Maarten's blessing for the project, recruited a new American line-up. Apart from Richie and Mad Joe, the new line-up included Tony Meltdown from The Ninth Plague on guitar, Shannon from  Out To Win/Mushmouth on drums, and Greg "Big Show", a local Stroudsburg musician, on bass. With this line up they would record their first official full length "Die Young". This lineup remained stable for the band's next several full length and minor releases. During this period the band began to develop its sound by incorporating  various  metal, crossover, and  hard rock  elements into its songs. After the completion of "Everything You Know" longtime member Tony Meltdown left the band for personal reasons. Soon after the release of the "Pocono Ghosts" 7", longtime member Greg "Big Show" also left the band due to an injury.  They were replaced by Evan, from Mad Joe's old band Feeble, on bass and Mav, from Richie's old band Krutch, on guitar.

As of 2015, three members of the band are straight edge.

Current members 
Mad Joe Black — vocals
Richie Krutch — guitar, backing vocals
Luke — drums
Evan 'Boy' One — bass, backing vocals
Mav — guitar

Past members 
Maarten – guitar
Shawn – drums
Roel – drums
Harry – bass
Greg "Big Show" – bass, backing vocals
Tony Meltdown – guitar, backing vocals
Shannon Sparky – drums

Discography

Studio albums

Extended plays

Split EPs

Videography 

§ Die for Us DVD contains live material (14 songs) recorded at show from May 2006 at Backstage Enterprises in Kingston, Pennsylvania, interview with Mad Joe Black and a three-song recording from live performance at the First Unitarian Church in Philadelphia.

References

External links 
SK: Underground Music Reviews, Music Hosting & Message Boards – Hardcore, Metal, Hip-Hop, Emo, Indie and Punk
band's page on Eulogy Recordings site
The band's page on I Scream Records site

Hardcore punk groups from Pennsylvania
Musical groups established in 2002
Musical quintets
2002 establishments in Pennsylvania
Straight edge groups
Demons Run Amok Entertainment artists
Eulogy Recordings artists